Kolo Abib Touré (born 19 March 1981) is an Ivorian professional football coach and former player. He most recently managed Championship side Wigan Athletic. He previously served as a first team coach at Leicester City as well as a member of the coaching staff for the Ivory Coast national team.

Beginning his career as a defender with ASEC Mimosas, Touré moved to English team Arsenal in 2002, where he made 326 appearances for the club and was a member of the 03–04 'invincibles' side. In 2009, he moved to Manchester City, where he was joined a year later by his younger brother, Yaya Touré, helping City earn their first league title in 44 years. In 2013, Touré signed for Liverpool. He is one of the eight players who have won the Premier League with two clubs, having won it with Arsenal and City. He also won the Scottish Premiership and Scottish League Cup with Celtic. He remains to date the African player with the most Premier League appearances (353 in total).

Touré is the second-most capped player for the Ivory Coast, with 120 appearances from 2000 to 2015. He represented the team at the 2006, 2010 and 2014 FIFA World Cup tournaments. Touré also represented the Ivory Coast at seven Africa Cup of Nations tournaments between 2002 and 2015, helping them finish runner-up in 2006 and 2012, while winning in 2015.

Club career

Arsenal

Born in Bouaké, Touré joined Premier League team Arsenal from ASEC Mimosas on a long-term contract for a fee of £150,000 on 14 February 2002 after a short trial.

His status as a full international meant Touré was able to secure a British work permit. Touré did not make his debut for the first team until the next season, against Liverpool in the FA Community Shield in August 2002. Initially regarded as a utility player, he started his Arsenal career as a defensive midfielder as well as at right-back. He scored his first Arsenal goal at Stamford Bridge in a 1–1 draw against Chelsea. Arsenal failed to retain the Premiership crown that season, but Touré made a big step in his career nonetheless, winning the FA Cup as an unused substitute in the final.

At the start of the 2003–04 season, Wenger began using Touré as a central defender alongside Sol Campbell. He formed an effective partnership with Campbell and had a great season during which Arsenal were undefeated in the league, claiming the title. Having previously been a striker or attacking midfielder, he made a reputation for himself as being an attacking defender, although he only scored one goal and had one assist.

Touré was in and out of the Arsenal team during the 2004–05 season, battling for a first team place with the likes of Philippe Senderos and Pascal Cygan to play alongside Sol Campbell in defence. Touré ended the season with a FA Cup winners medal playing 50 times for Arsenal that season and scoring one goal. His only goal of the 2004–05 season came in the 90th minute of Arsenal's UEFA Champions League last 16 round tie against Bayern Munich of Germany. Arsenal lost the game 3–1.

Touré established himself as a permanent fixture in the Arsenal starting XI. In the 2005–06 season, he established a formidable defensive partnership with Senderos. Both centre-backs helped the Arsenal team reach the 2006 UEFA Champions League Final after keeping 10 consecutive clean sheets (a European competition record).

Touré scored his second European goal on 19 April 2006, the winner in the first leg of the Champions League semi-final against Villarreal CF. It was the final European goal scored at Highbury and the goal that effectively decided the tie (Arsenal won 1–0 on aggregate), to send Arsenal through to their first ever Champions League Final, in Paris, France.

Touré was handed the number 5 shirt for the 2006–07 season, which had been vacant since the departure of Martin Keown. In August 2006, Touré signed a new four-year deal with Arsenal.

Touré was the junior vice-captain in the 2006–07 season after former vice-captain Gilberto Silva and former captain Thierry Henry. He captained Arsenal for the first time on 9 January 2007 during a 6–3 victory over Liverpool in the League Cup. He also led the Gunners out for the final of this competition, having also captained them in the semi-final first leg against Tottenham Hotspur. He became the longest-serving member of the current Arsenal squad following the departures of Jérémie Aliadière, Thierry Henry and Freddie Ljungberg during the summer transfer window in 2007. He also captained Arsenal in a string of games early in the 2007–08 season after captain William Gallas was injured in the game against Blackburn Rovers. He scored a free kick in a match against Bolton Wanderers, where his shot was low and went under two Bolton players and beat Jussi Jääskeläinen. However, during the Africa Cup of Nations, he suffered an injury and looked a bit out of place when he returned and then injured himself again in the Champions League against A.C. Milan when he blocked Alexandre Pato's shot with his leg and was carried off the pitch after treatment. Touré returned to the starting lineup against Middlesbrough on 15 March and scored the equalising goal for Arsenal in the final 10 minutes.

On 13 April 2009, Touré demanded a move away from Arsenal after a reputed bust-up with defensive partner Gallas. He reportedly handed in a transfer request which was later turned down by Arsenal chairman Peter Hill-Wood. However, Touré temporarily reversed his decision and committed to the Gunners at least until the summer.

Manchester City

After much transfer speculation, it was announced on 28 July 2009 that Manchester City had agreed a fee of £14 million for Touré. After he successfully passed a medical in Manchester on 29 July 2009, Touré signed a four-year contract with the club which had the option of extending it to five years. City, who had finished 10th the previous season, had made a number of high-profile signings in preparation for the 2009–10 season, and Touré hoped to help make City a top four team. He was appointed the club captain by Mark Hughes. He scored his first goal for Manchester City in a 2–1 League Cup win over Fulham on 23 September 2009. He scored his first league goal for City against Burnley on 7 November 2009. Manchester City finished the season in fifth position, losing out to Tottenham Hotspur by just three points. On 2 July 2010, Kolo Touré was joined by his brother Yaya at Manchester City following a transfer believed to be worth around £24 million.

At the beginning of the 2010–11 season, Roberto Mancini took away the captain's armband from Touré and gave it to Carlos Tevez. However, he remained part of Mancini's plans and was a first team regular in defence. He was sent off in Manchester City's 2–1 defeat to Everton on 20 December 2010, helping to deny City the chance to top the Premier League table on Christmas. On 15 January 2011, Touré scored the first goal in a 4–3 win for the Citizens which sent them to the top of the league table.

On 3 March 2011, it was revealed that Touré had failed a drug test and had been suspended. The World Anti-Doping Agency imposed a 6-month suspension from football effective 2 March 2011.

In the 2011–12 season, Touré was used as a squad player, making 14 league appearances as Manchester City won a league title for the first time in 44 years.

Liverpool

On 28 May 2013, Liverpool announced that an agreement had been reached in principle to sign Touré on a free transfer from Manchester City. On 2 July he was unveiled as Liverpool's first signing of the window and was handed the number 4 shirt. He signed a two-year contract. On 13 July 2013, he made his debut for Liverpool in a 4–0 win in a preseason friendly over Preston North End. He made his Premier League debut for Liverpool on 17 August 2013 in a 1–0 victory over Stoke City at Anfield. On 2 February 2014, in a match against West Bromwich Albion he made a costly mistake, passing the ball straight to Victor Anichebe, who scored an equaliser. On 12 February 2014, he scored an own-goal in a match against Fulham, which eventually Liverpool won thanks to a late penalty from skipper Steven Gerrard.

On 1 March 2015, he came on as an 83rd-minute substitute against Manchester City, marking the first time he and his brother Yaya, who started the match for City, faced each other in a competitive match.

Touré scored his first Liverpool goal on 14 February 2016, heading in Jordan Henderson's corner kick to confirm a 6–0 win away to bottom side Aston Villa. It was his first goal in any match since January 2011, and he celebrated wildly.

At the end of the 2015–16 season, Touré was released.

Celtic
On 24 July 2016, Touré reunited with former manager Brendan Rodgers when he joined Celtic on a one-year contract. He made his debut on 3 August 2016, coming on as a substitute in the second half of Celtic's 2–1 win over FC Astana in a Champions League qualifier. He made 20 appearances as Celtic completed an unbeaten domestic season, winning a treble of League, Cup and League Cup. Touré was not offered a new playing contract at the end of the season.

In September 2017, Touré announced his retirement and took up a coaching role with Celtic.

International career

Touré made his debut for Ivory Coast in April 2000 against Rwanda. He played in all five games for the Ivory Coast as they finished runners up to the hosts in the African Cup of Nations in Egypt in January 2006.

He was named in the 23-man squad taken by coach Henri Michel to the 2006 FIFA World Cup and made his first appearance in a FIFA World Cup on 11 June 2006 in the Ivory Coast's 2–1 loss to Argentina. He has scored three goals for the Ivory Coast to date, two of them headers against Guinea and Gabon one against Japan, a 20-yard shot from outside the penalty area that flew into the top corner of the goal.

Touré was named for the Ivory Coast for the 2010 FIFA World Cup and was the captain in the team's first game vs. Portugal due to Didier Drogba's injury, which kept him benched.

In December 2014, Touré announced his intention to retire from international football after the 2015 Africa Cup of Nations. He played his final game in the final of the tournament on 8 February 2015, where Ivory Coast beat Ghana 9–8 on penalties after the game ended 0–0. He took the seventh penalty for Ivory Coast, which he scored. On 15 February 2015, he confirmed his retirement from international duty.

Coaching career
On 9 August 2017, the Ivorian Football Federation appointed Touré as a new member of their coaching staff for the African Nations Championship and under-23 team. He joined Celtic's coaching staff as a technical assistant in September 2017. In February 2019, Brendan Rodgers left Celtic for Leicester City, and Touré also joined Leicester as a first team coach.

Wigan Athletic 
On 29 November 2022, Wigan Athletic appointed Touré as first team manager on a three and a half-year deal. On 2 January 2023, Touré's team lost their third consecutive game by the scoreline of 4–1, and dropped to last place in the Championship as a result. Toure was sacked by Wigan on 26 January 2023, with the club bottom of the Championship and failing to win any of his nine games in charge.

Personal life
He is the older brother of Ibrahim Touré and Yaya Touré. Ibrahim died of cancer in 2014, aged 28. They also have a sister, Belinda.

Touré is a Muslim and observes fasting during the Islamic month of Ramadan, stating that "It doesn't affect me physically. It makes me stronger. You can do it when you believe so strongly in something. A normal human can be without water for much longer than one day."

Touré is married to Awo. As of 2011, they had a son and a daughter. His son, Yassine, is also pursuing a football career, having signed a two-year scholarship with Leicester City in December 2021.

Career statistics

Club

International

Scores and results list Ivory Coast's goal tally first, score column indicates score after each Touré goal.

Managerial statistics

Honours
Arsenal
Premier League: 2003–04
FA Cup: 2002–03, 2004–05
FA Community Shield: 2002, 2004
Football League Cup runner-up: 2006–07
UEFA Champions League runner-up: 2005–06

Manchester City
Premier League: 2011–12
FA Community Shield: 2012

Liverpool
Football League Cup runner-up: 2015–16
UEFA Europa League runner-up: 2015–16

Celtic
Scottish Premiership: 2016–17
Scottish League Cup: 2016–17

Ivory Coast
Africa Cup of Nations: 2015

Individual
Africa Cup of Nations Team of the Tournament: 2015

See also

List of footballers with 100 or more caps

References

External links

1981 births
Living people
People from Bouaké
Ivorian Muslims
Ivorian footballers
Association football defenders
Association football midfielders
Association football utility players
ASEC Mimosas players
Arsenal F.C. players
Manchester City F.C. players
Liverpool F.C. players
Celtic F.C. players
Premier League players
Scottish Professional Football League players
Ivory Coast international footballers
2002 African Cup of Nations players
2006 FIFA World Cup players
2006 Africa Cup of Nations players
2008 Africa Cup of Nations players
2010 Africa Cup of Nations players
2010 FIFA World Cup players
2012 Africa Cup of Nations players
2013 Africa Cup of Nations players
2014 FIFA World Cup players
2015 Africa Cup of Nations players
FIFA Century Club
Africa Cup of Nations-winning players
Ivorian sportspeople in doping cases
Doping cases in association football
Ivorian expatriate footballers
Ivorian emigrants to the United Kingdom
Ivorian expatriate sportspeople in England
Ivorian expatriate sportspeople in Scotland
Expatriate footballers in England
Expatriate footballers in Scotland
Celtic F.C. non-playing staff
Leicester City F.C. non-playing staff
Wigan Athletic F.C. managers
FA Cup Final players
Association football coaches